The Vassil Levski National Sports Academy, commonly referred to as the NSA, is Bulgaria's premiere higher education institution specializing in teaching physical education. It is named after national hero Vasil Levski.

History
The academy was established in 1942 by a decree of Tsar Boris III as the Higher School for Physical Education. It was named Higher Institute for Physical Education and Sport from 1953 to 1995.
In 1995, by decision of the National Assembly, the VIF was renamed the National Sports Academy. Discover a new, modernly-equipped educational building in the Student Town of Darvenica. A high-mountain training base at the Vitosha National Academy was created during that time.

Academics
The university offers bachelor's, master's, and doctoral degrees in a wide variety of sports-related disciplines. Curricula are distributed among three faculties:
 Faculty of Coaching
 Faculty of Physical Education
 Faculty of Kinesiotherapy, Tourism, and Sports Animation

Careers
The alumni of the National Sports Academy have found professional realization as:
 Coaches of club or national teams, as well as trainers in youth sports academies;
 Teachers and lecturers in physical education and sports at kindergartens, schools, and universities;
 Kinesitherapists or physiotherapists in hospitals, sanatoriums, and rehabilitation centers;
 Instructors in fitness and SPA centers;
 Sport Animators in sports and leisure centers;
 Trainers of people with disabilities and special educational needs;
 Sports Psychologists of elite athletes and teams;
 Managers of sports clubs, fitness centers, sports facilities, sports federations, and associations;
 Sports journalists and commentators in electronic and print media;
 Specialists in physical and martial applied training in the system of Ministry of Interior and Ministry of Defense.

Basketball
National Sports Academy men's basketball team won Bulgarian Cup in 1964.

Cricket

In September 2020, the ground was selected to host the first official T20I matches played in Bulgaria.

References

National Institutes of Sport
Universities and colleges in Sofia
Sports academies
Sports universities and colleges
Educational institutions established in 1942
1942 establishments in Bulgaria